Joachim Soltvedt (born 9 September 1995) is a Norwegian football player currently playing as a midfielder for Sarpsborg 08.

Career statistics

References

1995 births
Living people
Footballers from Bergen
Norwegian footballers
SK Brann players
Åsane Fotball players
Sogndal Fotball players
Sarpsborg 08 FF players
Norwegian First Division players
Eliteserien players
Association football midfielders